The Tilley lamp is a kerosene pressure lamp.

History
In 1813, John Tilley invented the hydro-pneumatic blowpipe. In 1818, William Henry Tilley, gas fitters, was manufacturing gas lamps in  Stoke Newington, and, in the 1830s, in Shoreditch.

In 1846, Abraham Pineo Gesner invented coal oil, a substitute for whale oil for lighting, distilled from coal. Kerosene, made from petroleum, later became a popular lighting fuel. In 1853, most versions of the kerosene lamp were invented by Polish inventor and pharmacist Ignacy Łukasiewicz, in Lviv. It was a significant improvement over lamps designed to burn vegetable or sperm oil.

On 23 September 1885, Carl Auer von Welsbach received a patent on the gas flame heated incandescent mantle light.

In 1914, the Coleman Lantern pressure lamp was introduced by the Coleman Company.

In 1915, during World War I, the Tilley company moved to Brent Street in Hendon, and began developing a kerosene pressure lamp.

In 1919, Tilley High-Pressure Gas Company started using kerosene as a fuel for lamps.

In the 1920s, Tilley company got a contract to supply lamps to railways, and made domestic lamps.

During World War II, Armed Forces purchased quantities of lamps, thus many sailors, soldiers and airmen used a Tilley Lamp.

After World War II, demand for Tilley Lamps drove expansion to a second factory, in Cricklewood, then a third, merged, single factory in Colindale.

The company moved to Northern Ireland in the early 1960s, finally settling in Belfast. It moved back to England in 2000.

Competing lamps
 
Aladdin Industries
Bat lamps
Bialaddin lamps
Coleman Company
Fama lamps
Optimus lamps
Petromax
Primus stove
Solar lamps
Vapalux
Veritas lamps

See also
Davy lamp
Naphtha flare

Further reading
Jim Dick, A History of Tilley Lamps

References

External links

Principles of Tilley lamp operation
Tilley lamp resource fansite

Oil lamp
British brands
Lighting brands
Articles containing video clips